Rein Bazar is a part of Old City, Hyderabad, India.

Transport
TSRTC there are no buses from Rein Bazar.

The closest MMTS Train station is at Yakutpura.

Bus services of TSRTC will operate from Bagh-E-Jahanara to Charminar .

Neighbourhoods in Hyderabad, India